The 2017 Magyar Kupa (known as the BENU Férfi Magyar Kupa for sponsorship reasons), was the 91st edition of the tournament.

Schedule
The rounds of the 2017 competition are scheduled as follows:

Preliminary round
The first round ties are scheduled for 23 and 24 September 2017.

Group A
Tournament will be played at Kemény Dénes Sportuszoda, Miskolc.

Group B
Tournament will be played at Tiszaligeti uszoda (Vizilabda Aréna), Szolnok.

Group C
Tournament will be played at Kőér utcai uszoda, Budapest.

Group D
Tournament will be played at Virágfürdő, Kaposvár.

Quarter-finals
Quarter-final matches were played on 25 and 26 November 2017.

|}

Final four

The final four was held on 2 and 3 December 2017 at the Császár-Komjádi Swimming Stadium in Budapest, II. ker.

Semi-finals

Final

Final standings

See also
2017–18 Országos Bajnokság I (National Championship of Hungary)
2017 Szuperkupa (Super Cup of Hungary)

References

External links
 Hungarian Water Polo Federaration

Seasons in Hungarian water polo competitions
Hungary
Magyar Kupa Men